William Shepherd (born 8 November 1881, date of death unknown) was a British wrestler. He competed in the men's freestyle lightweight at the 1908 Summer Olympics.

References

External links
 

1881 births
Year of death missing
British male sport wrestlers
Olympic wrestlers of Great Britain
Wrestlers at the 1908 Summer Olympics
Place of birth missing